Ostasio III da Polenta (died 1447) was the last lord of Ravenna of the da Polenta family.

The son of Obizzo da Polenta, he inherited Ravenna but under the control of a provveditore from the nearby Republic of Venice. In 1438 the condottiero Niccolò Piccinino, commander of the Milanese troops, invaded the lordship, forcing Ostasio to ally himself with the Visconti of Milan against Venice. The latter sent a fleet which conquered Ravenna without opposition, putting an end to the Polentani seigniory in February 1441.

Ostasio was exiled to a Benedictine convent in Candia, in Crete, where he died in 1447, probably assassinated.

See also
Wars in Lombardy

1447 deaths
Ostasio 3
Assassinated Italian people
15th-century Italian nobility
Year of birth unknown
Lords of Ravenna